George James Webb, born on June 24, 1803 near Salisbury in Wiltshire, England, died on October 7, 1887 in Orange, New Jersey was an English-American composer. He was known for writing "Stand Up, Stand Up for Jesus". He is buried in Orange's Rosedale Cemetery.

References

External links
A short biography 

1803 births
1887 deaths
People from Salisbury
English composers
American male composers
English emigrants to the United States
19th-century American composers
19th-century English musicians
19th-century British male musicians